Rita Windbrake (born 28 July 1945) is a former German deaf track and field athlete. She represented both West Germany and Germany at Deaflympics, World Deaf Championships.

Windbrake competed at the Deaflympics on seven occasions from 1965 to 1993.

Rita Windbrake is considered one of the greatest Deaflympic athletes of all time with a career record of 24 medals at the Deaflympics, including 14 gold medals.

In 1984, she won the German-American 1500 metres Deaf track meet.

She also holds several world records in Athletics including 800 metres for women. Windbrake also holds the Deaflympic records for 800 metres, 1000 metres, 1500 metres etc.

References 

1945 births
Living people
Deaf competitors in athletics
West German female sprinters
German deaf people
German female sprinters
German female middle-distance runners
West German female middle-distance runners
20th-century German women